Maudland Bridge railway station was once the Preston terminus of the Longridge Branch Line, in Lancashire, England. It was located on Maudland Road, between a bridge over the Lancaster Canal and Cold Bath Street. The Maudlands district of Preston gets its name from the medieval St. Mary Magdalen's leper hospital, which once stood near the present-day St Walburge's Church.

History 

The plan was to link Fleetwood on the Fylde coast to Skipton in the West Riding of Yorkshire. However the plan collapsed in 1852, and so the tunnel was initially used for goods traffic only.

In 1856, the FP&WRR revived and diverted passenger trains via the tunnel to a new Maudland Bridge station. By 1867 the line was owned jointly by the Lancashire and Yorkshire Railway and the London and North Western Railway (LNWR). In 1885, the track layout at Maudland was altered to allow Longridge trains to run on the adjacent LNWR West Coast Main Line to Preston railway station, and Maudland Bridge was closed. A goods station, to replace the demolished P&WR Maudland station, was built nearby.

Although the line through Maudland Bridge station closed to passengers in 1930, it continued to be used for goods until the 1990s. Some of the tracks, now rusty and overgrown, still exist, although the station itself (which was situated on the northern side of Maudlands Street opposite where the University of Central Lancashire's Foster and JB Firth buildings are now located) is long demolished.

Accidents 

The disused Miley Tunnel has been the site of several accidents in recent years. Two young men were injured in separate incidents in 1998 and 2000, each falling over  into the tunnel off a wall near Moor Lane. On Christmas Day 2002, a drunken youth fell to his death at the same point. Network Rail erected  fences six weeks later.

In October 2003 another drunken man fell onto the disused line at Maudland Bank but escaped serious injury.

The future 

In 2003, the Preston City Link Canal Trust was formed with a plan to reopen part of the Lancaster Canal to a new marina to be constructed in the vicinity of the former Maudland Bridge station. One option being considered is to reopen the Longridge line as far as Deepdale or Ribbleton, the line passing by viaduct over the new marina.

Notes

References 
 Hunt, D. (2003) The Wharncliffe Companion to Preston — An A to Z of Local History, Wharncliffe Books, Barnsley, .
 Suggitt, G. (2003, revised 2004) Lost Railways of Lancashire, Countryside Books, Newbury, 
 Till, J.M. (1993) A History of Longridge and its People, Carnegie Publishing, Preston, 

 

Disused railway stations in Preston
Former Preston and Longridge Railway stations
Railway stations in Great Britain opened in 1856
Railway stations in Great Britain closed in 1885